Dyer Island is the name of several islands:
Dyer Island (Antarctica)
Dyer Island, Bermuda
Dyer Island (Rhode Island), United States
Dyer Island (South Africa), near Gansbaai, South Africa
Dyer Island (Western Australia)